Platte Creek Recreation Area is a South Dakota state recreation area located on the eastern shore of Lake Francis Case, a Missouri River Reservoir in Gregory County, South Dakota in the United States. The area is open for year-round recreation including camping, swimming, fishing, hiking and boating.

See also
Fort Randall
List of South Dakota state parks

References

External links
 Platte Creek Recreation Area - South Dakota Dept. of Game, Fish & Parks
 Lake Francis Case - U.S. Army Corps of Engineers

Protected areas of Charles Mix County, South Dakota
Protected areas of South Dakota
State parks of South Dakota